Louis Marie Joseph de Brigode (21 October 1776, Lille - 22 September 1827, Bourbonne-les-Bains) was a French politician under the First French Empire and the Bourbon Restoration. He was from an old noble family from French Flanders and his elder brother Romain-Joseph de Brigode-Kemlandt was also a nobleman and politician. He is also notable as the first husband of Émilie Pellapra.

Sources
 « Louis Marie Joseph de Brigode », dans Robert et Cougny, Dictionnaire des parlementaires français, 1889

1776 births
1827 deaths
Politicians from Lille
Members of the Chamber of Peers of the Bourbon Restoration
French Freemasons